Ibrahima Bakayoko (born 31 December 1976) is a retired Ivorian footballer who played as a striker.

Club career
Playing in France with Montpellier, Bakayoko was rated highly enough by Everton manager Walter Smith that Smith was willing to pay £4.5 million for Bakayoko's services in October 1998. However, he failed to impress in the 23 games he played, only finding the net four times in the league (seven times in all competitions). A brief highlight was scoring twice as Everton beat Blackburn Rovers 2–1 at Ewood Park. He was sold for £4 million in June 1999 to Marseille.

A spell in Spain with Osasuna followed, before Bakayoko returned for a third spell in France, this time representing Istres, before he moved over the Alps to Italy, first with Livorno and then with Messina. On 28 January 2007, he played his first Serie A match for Messina against Ascoli.

In the summer of 2007, he joined Greek SuperLeague outfit AE Larissa. On 20 September 2007, he scored from 30 yards for his new side in the UEFA Cup first round first leg against English Premier League side Blackburn. On 19 June 2008, he joined PAOK for a year.

After his contract expired, Bakayoko signed a two-year contract for newly promoted PAS Giannina on 27 July 2009.

International career
Bakayoko is a former international for Ivory Coast. He made his first appearance for The Elephants in 1995.

Personal life
Bakayoko is the uncle of the French footballer Ryan Bakayoko.

Honours
PAS Giannina
Greek Second Division: 2010–11

Individual
 Greek Football League top goalscorer: 2010–11

References

External links

1976 births
Living people
People from Woroba District
Ivorian footballers
U.S. Livorno 1915 players
CA Osasuna players
Everton F.C. players
A.C.R. Messina players
FC Istres players
Association football forwards
Ivorian expatriate footballers
Ivory Coast international footballers
French sportspeople of Ivorian descent
La Liga players
Ligue 1 players
Montpellier HSC players
Olympique de Marseille players
Expatriate footballers in France
Premier League players
Serie A players
Super League Greece players
Athlitiki Enosi Larissa F.C. players
Olympiacos Volos F.C. players
PAOK FC players
PAS Giannina F.C. players
Expatriate footballers in Greece
Expatriate footballers in Italy
Ivorian expatriate sportspeople in Italy
Expatriate footballers in England
Expatriate footballers in Spain
Stade d'Abidjan players
Ivorian expatriate sportspeople in Greece
1996 African Cup of Nations players
1998 African Cup of Nations players
2000 African Cup of Nations players
2002 African Cup of Nations players
Stade Bordelais (football) players